Geographic data and information is defined in the ISO/TC 211 series of standards as data and information having an implicit or explicit association with a location relative to Earth (a geographic location or geographic position).

It is also called geospatial data and information, georeferenced data and information, as well as geodata and geoinformation.  geospatial data and information include hydrospatial data and information. Hydrospatial is all about the blue of our blue planet and its contiguous zones.

Approximately 90% of government sourced data has a location component. Location information (known by the many names mentioned here) is stored in a geographic information system (GIS).

There are also many different types of geodata, including vector files, raster files, geographic databases, web files, and multi-temporal data.

Spatial data or spatial information is broader class of data whose geometry is relevant but it is not necessarily georeferenced, such as in computer-aided design (CAD), see geometric modeling.

Fields of study
Geographic data and information are the subject of a number of overlapping fields of study, mainly:
 Geocomputation
 Geographic information science
 Geoinformatics
 Geomatics
 Geovisualization
This is in addition to other more specific branches, such as:
 Cartography
 Geodesy
 Geography
 Geostatistics
 Photogrammetry
 Remote sensing
 Spatial data analysis
 Surveying
 Topography

See also

 Earth observation data
 Geographic feature
 Georeferencing
 Geospatial intelligence
 Ubiquitous geographic information

References

Further reading
 Roger A. Longhorn and Michael Blakemore (2007), Geographic Information: Value, Pricing, Production, and Consumption, CRC Press.

External links